The Health and Safety Executive (HSE) is a UK government agency responsible for the encouragement, regulation and enforcement of workplace health, safety and welfare, and for research into occupational risks in Great Britain.  It is a non-departmental public body of the United Kingdom with its headquarters in Bootle, England. In Northern Ireland, these duties lie with the Health and Safety Executive for Northern Ireland. The HSE was created by the Health and Safety at Work etc. Act 1974, and has since absorbed earlier regulatory bodies such as the Factory Inspectorate and the Railway Inspectorate though the Railway Inspectorate was transferred to the Office of Rail and Road in April 2006. The HSE is sponsored by the Department for Work and Pensions. As part of its work, HSE investigates industrial accidents, small and large, including major incidents such as the explosion and fire at Buncefield in 2005. Though it formerly reported to the Health and Safety Commission, on 1 April 2008, the two bodies merged.

Functions
The Executive's duties are to:
Assist and encourage persons concerned with matters relevant to the operation of the objectives of the Health and Safety at Work etc. Act 1974.
Make arrangements for and encourage research and publication, training, and information in connection with its work.
Make arrangements for securing government departments, employers, employees, their respective representative organisations, and other persons are provided with an information and advisory service and are kept informed of, and adequately advised on such matters.
Propose health and safety regulations.

The Executive is further obliged to keep the Secretary of State informed of its plans and ensure alignment with the policies of the Secretary of State, giving effect to any directions given to it. The Secretary of State can give directions to the Executive.

The Railway Inspectorate was transferred to HSE in 1990. On 1 April 2006, the Executive ceased to have responsibility for railway safety, when the Railway Inspectorate was transferred to the Office of Rail Regulation (now the Office of Rail and Road).

The Executive is responsible for the Employment Medical Advisory Service, which operates as part of its Field Operations Directorate.

Structure and responsibilities
Local authorities are responsible for the enforcement of health and safety legislation in shops, offices, and other parts of the service sector.

Agencies belonging to the HSE include

Health and Safety Executive, Science Division

Based in Buxton, Derbyshire, the Health and Safety Executive Science Division (HSL- Health & Safety Laboratory) employs over 350 people including scientists, engineers, psychologists, social scientists, health professionals, and technical specialists.

It was established in 1921 under the Safety in Mines Research Board to carry out large-scale tests related to mining hazards. Following the formation of the HSE, in 1975 the facilities became a Safety Engineering Laboratory and an Explosion and Flame Research Laboratory, operating as part of the Research Laboratories Service Division of the HSE. In 1995 the HSL was formed, including the Buxton site and laboratories in Sheffield. In 2004 the Sheffield activities moved to Buxton, and the University of Sheffield took over the Sheffield laboratory site.

It now operates as an agency carrying out scientific research and investigations (e.g. on the Buncefield fire) for the HSE, other government agencies and the private sector.

HM Inspectorate of Mines
HM Inspectorate of Mines is responsible for the correct implementation and inspection of safe working procedures within all UK mine workings. It is based in Sheffield, South Yorkshire.

Offshore Safety Division 
The Offshore Safety Division (OSD) was established as a division within HSE in April 1991. This was in response to recommendations of the Cullen Inquiry into the Piper Alpha disaster on 6 July 1988. At the time of the disaster, the Department of Energy (DEn) was responsible for both production and offshore safety; this was perceived as entailing a conflict of interests. Dr Tony Barrell, Director of HSE's Technology and Air Pollution Division was appointed Chief Executive of OSD, having previously been seconded to the DEn to lead the transfer of responsibilities. At the same time, Ministerial oversight was transferred from the DEn to the Department of Employment. The Offshore Safety Act 1992 made the Mineral Workings (Offshore Installations) Act 1971 and its subsidiary Regulations relevant statutory provisions of the Health and Safety at work etc., Act 1974.
The OSD's initial responsibilities included the establishment of the Safety Case Regulations; a thorough review of existing safety legislation and the move towards a goal setting regulatory regime.
OSD became part of the HSE's new Hazardous Installations Directorate in 1999; it became part of the new Energy Division in 2013.

OSHCR (Occupational Safety & Health Consultants Register)
The HSE currently administrates the Occupational Safety & Health Consultants Register (OSHCR), a central register of registered safety consultants within the United Kingdom.  The intention of the HSE is to pass responsibility of operating the register to the relevant trade & professional bodies once the register is up and running.

Personnel

Directors general of the Health and Safety Executive 

List of directors general:

 January 1975 - December 1983: John Howard Locke CB (b. 26 December 1923, d. 26 September 1998)
 January 1984 - 30 June 1995: John David Rimington CB (b. 27 June 1935) 
 3 July 1995 – 30 Sept 2000: Jennifer (Jenny) Helen Bacon CB (b. 16 April 1945) 
 1 October 2000 – November 2005: Timothy Edward Hanson Walker CB (b. 27 July 1945) 
 November 2005 - 31 March 2008: Geoffrey John Freeman Podger CB (b. 3 August 1952)

The HSE and the Health and Safety Commission merged on 1 April 2008.

Deputy directors general of the Health and Safety Executive 

 (Lois) Audrey Pittom CB (b. 1918, d. 1990) 1975-78
 Bryan Hugh Harvey (b. 1914, d. 2004) 1975-76
 James Carver (b. 1916, d. 2007) 1976-77
 Eric Williams (b. 1915, d. 1980) 1975-76
 (Herbert) John Dunster CB (b. 1922, d. 2006) 1976-82
 Dr Kenneth Playfair Duncan (b. 1924, d. 1999) 1982-84
 David Charles Thomas Eves CB (b. 1942) 1989-2002
 Jenny Helen Bacon CB (b. 1945) 1992-95
 Richard Hillier CB 1996-2001
 Kate Timms 2001-04
 (James) Justin McCracken (b. 1955) 2002-08
 Jonathan Rees 2004-08

The HSE and the Health and Safety Commission merged on 1 April 2008.

Chair and chief executive of the Health and Safety Executive 

Chairs:
 Dame Judith Elizabeth Hackitt CBE (b. 1 December 1954) 1 April 2008 – 31 March 2016
 George Brechin interim chair April 2016
 Martin Temple CBE 1 May 2016 - 31 July 2020
 Sarah Newton from 1 August 2020 - Date.
Chief Executives:
 Geoffrey John Freeman Podger CB (b. 3 August 1952) 1 April 2008 – 31 August 2013
 (Denis) Kevin Myers CBE (b. 30 September 1954) Acting Chief Executive 1 September 2013 – 9 November 2014
 Richard Judge (b. 2 November 1962) 10 November 2014 – 17 August 2018
 David Snowball Acting Chief Executive 15 June 2018 – 1 September 2019
 Sarah Albon 1 September 2019 - date

Heads of OSD 

 Dr Anthony (Tony) Charles Barrell (b.1933) CB, FEng, BSc, D Eng, FIChemE, Eur Ing (Chief Executive), April 1991 - June 1994
 Roderick Stuart Allison (b.1936), CB, (Chief Executive) July 1994 - 1996
 Dr Allan Douglas Sefton (b. 1945), 1996 - June 2000
 T.A.F. Powell, June 2000 - December 2005
 Ian Whewell, January 2006 - October 2009
 Steve Walker, October 2009 - March 2013

Criticism

Some of the criticism of HSE has been that its procedures are inadequate to protect safety. For example, the public enquiry by Lord Gill into the Stockline Plastics factory explosion criticised the HSE for "inadequate appreciation of the risks associated with buried LPG pipework…and a failure properly to carry out check visits". However, most criticism of the HSE is that their regulations are over-broad, suffocating, and part of a nanny state. The Daily Telegraph has claimed that the HSE is part of a "compensation culture," that it is undemocratic and unaccountable, and that its rules are costing jobs.

However, the HSE denies this, saying that much of the criticism is misplaced because it relates to matters outside the HSE's remit. The HSE also responded to criticism by publishing a "Myth of the Month" section on its website between 2007 and 2010, which it described as "exposing the various myths about 'health and safety'". This has become a political issue in the UK. The Lord Young report, published in October 2010, recommended various reforms aiming "to free businesses from unnecessary bureaucratic burdens and the fear of having to pay out unjustified damages claims and legal fees."

Areas of regulation

The HSE focuses regulation of health and safety in the following sectors of industry:
Agriculture
Air transport
Armed forces
Catering and hospitality
Construction industries
Crown establishments
Chemical manufacture and storage industries
Professional diving
Dockwork
Education sector e.g. schools
Engineering sector
Entertainment and leisure industry
Fire service
Food and drink manufacturing
Footwear and leather industries
Haulage
Health services e.g. hospitals
Gas supply and installation; Gas Safe Register
Laundries and dry-cleaning
Mining
Motor vehicle repair
Office work
Offshore oil and gas installations
Paper and board manufacturing industry
Pesticides
Police forces
Printing industries
Public services
The quarrying industry
Recycling and waste management industries
Textiles industries

References

External links
HSE website
HSL website

1974 establishments in the United Kingdom
Department for Work and Pensions
Health and safety in the United Kingdom
 
Law enforcement agencies of England and Wales
Law enforcement agencies of Scotland
Law enforcement agencies of Wales
Medical and health regulators
Non-departmental public bodies of the United Kingdom government
Occupational safety and health organizations
Organisations based in Liverpool
Organizations established in 1974
Regulators of the United Kingdom
Safety organizations